Calcutta News is a 24×7 satellite news channel also a free to air Bengali news channel based in Kolkata, West Bengal owned by AKD Group. It aired on 14 February 2016 by Calcutta Television Network Pvt. Ltd.  It serves not only the people of West Bengal but also the Bengali communities throughout the globe.

The vision of the channel is 'Apnar kotha Amader Kontho' Your words are our voice is best defined as a responsible channel tends to provide news concerning the needs of people from every sector of the Bengali community.

See also
CTVN AKD PLUS
CN Rashtriya
ABP Ananda
Zee 24 Ghanta

References

External links
 
Calcutta News on YouTube
Calcutta News on Facebook
Calcutta News on Twitter
Calcutta News on Instagram

24-hour television news channels in India
Television stations in Kolkata
Bengali-language television channels in India
Television channels and stations established in 2016